The Corridor is a 2010 Canadian horror film directed by Evan Kelly and starring Stephen Chambers, James Gilbert, David Patrick Flemming, Mary-Colin Chisholm and Nigel Bennett.

Plot

Friends on a weekend excursion follow a path into a forest that leads to death and horror.

A group of high school friends reunite years later for a weekend of partying and catching up on old times. Isolated deep in the snow-covered forest, they stumble upon a mysterious corridor of light. Like a drug, the corridor's energy consumes them, driving them to the point of madness. One by one, they turn on each other, taking their evil to the next level. Mayhem leads to murder as they race to outlast each other, and the corridor's supernatural powers.

Cast
 Stephen Chambers as Tyler Crawley 
 James Gilbert as Everett Manette  
 David Patrick Flemming as Chris Comeau 
 Matthew Amyotte as Robert 'Bobcat' Comeau
 Glen Matthews as Jim 'Huggs' Huggan 
 Mary-Colin Chisholm as Pauline Crawley
 Nigel Bennett  as Lee Shephard 
 Elphege Bernard as Female Student 
 Heather Salsbury as Lee

References

http://horrornews.net/50275/film-review-the-corridor-2010/

http://www.oh-the-horror.com/page.php?id=948

External links
 
 

2010 films
Canadian horror films
English-language Canadian films
2010s English-language films
2010s Canadian films